Booth's pipefish (Halicampus boothae) is a species of marine fish of the family Syngnathidae. It is found in the Western Indian Ocean, in South Africa and the Comoro Islands, and in the Western Pacific, from South Korea and Japan to the Great Barrier Reef and Tonga. This species is ovoviviparous, with males carrying eggs and giving birth to live young.

Etymology
The specific name honours for Julie Booth, who "presented many interesting fishes to the Australian Museum from New South Wales and Lord Howe Island".

Identification

Colour varies from light to dark brown, with evenly spaced pale bars along the pipefish's back and upper side. Usually has a pale snout tip.

References

Further reading

Encyclopedia of Life

boothae
Fish of the Indian Ocean
Fish of the Pacific Ocean
Taxa named by Gilbert Percy Whitley
Fish described in 1964